Girls' triathlon was part of the triathlon at the 2010 Summer Youth Olympics programme. The event consisted of  swimming,  cycling, and  running. It was held on 15 August 2010 at East Coast Park. The park is Singapore's most popular public beach and park; it is the venue of the Osim Singapore Triathlon, an Olympic triathlon event which began in 2002. Competitors swam in the open seas of the Singapore Strait and raced on the park's  track. U.S. triathlon coach Keith Dickson said the course favored strong swimmers and fast runners. Athletes were faced with environmental challenges such as strong sea currents and tropical heat and humidity. As the first medal event of the Singapore Games, the winner of this triathlon received the first gold medal in the Youth Olympic Games.

Yuka Sato of Japan finished the race in first place. She had placed third after the first leg of the race and fifth after the second leg. In the final stretch, Sato sped past Mexico's Adriana Barraza and Australia's Ellie Salthouse. As she crossed the finish line, Sato carried a Japanese flag that had been handed to her by a spectator. She was the only competitor who finished in the top 10 of the ITU Junior Triathlon World Championships in 2009. Salthouse and American Kelly Whitley finished in second and third place, respectively. Canada's Christine Ridenour, who was one of the favourites to win a medal, was involved in a bicycle crash and finished 14th. Singapore's Clara Wong finished in 30th place, and two competitors did not finish after a bicycle crash.

Most of the competition's 32 participants had qualified through the International Triathlon Union's continental Olympic qualifying events.

Medalists

Results 
The race began at approximately 9:00 a.m. (UTC+8) on 15 August at East Coast Park.

Note: No one is allotted the number 13.

References

External links 

Triathlon at the 2010 Summer Youth Olympics